Kathi-Anne Reinstein is a former American state legislator who served in the Massachusetts House of Representatives from 1999 to 2014. She is a Revere resident and a member of the Democratic Party. She resigned to become a lobbyist for Boston Beer Company.

See also
 Massachusetts House of Representatives' 16th Suffolk district

References

Living people
Democratic Party members of the Massachusetts House of Representatives
Women state legislators in Massachusetts
People from Revere, Massachusetts
Year of birth missing (living people)
21st-century American politicians
21st-century American women politicians